John Stewart  (c. 1755 – 1826), of 3D, The Albany, Piccadilly, Westminster, Middlesex, was an English politician.

He was a Member (MP) of the Parliament of the United Kingdom for Camelford from 17 April 1819 to 16 June 1819 but was unseated and disqualified for bribery and corruption.

His son was John Stewart who became member of Parliament for Lymington.

References

1755 births
1826 deaths
People from Westminster
Members of the Parliament of the United Kingdom for constituencies in Cornwall
UK MPs 1818–1820
Members of the Parliament of the United Kingdom for Camelford